Argyresthia arceuthina is a moth of the family Yponomeutidae. It is found in Europe.

The wingspan is 8–9 mm. The head and thorax are white, patagia bronzy. Forewings are bright shining golden-bronzy. The head is white. Forewings are  fuscous, with purple reflections, base ochreous; a thick white dorsal streak to tornus; a darker fuscous median fascia, interrupted in disc, edged with whitish on costa; some whitish costal strigulae posteriorly. Hindwings are pale grey.

Adults are on wing from April to June depending on the location.

The larvae feed on Juniperus species.

References

External links
UKmoths
Swedish Moths

Argyresthia
Moths of Europe